Libera Folio (English: Free Folio) is an online Esperanto periodical about the Esperanto movement independent from the Universal Esperanto Association, launched on 12 April 2003. It aims to shed light on current developments in the movement soberly and critically. István Ertl and Kalle Kniivilä founded it, with Kniivilä as editor. Jan-Ulrich Hasecke was technical director from 2004 to 2016. In September 2018 Jukka Pietiläinen replaced Kniivilä as editor.

Statistics 
In December 2006, the average daily number of visits exceeded 3000 visits for the first time. In March 2007, the average number of daily visits was 3597. In May 2012, Libera Folio had about 70,000 visits a month.

References

External links 
 

Esperanto
Esperanto magazines
International newspapers
Internet properties established in 2003